This list's purpose is to compile a list of Pittsburgh's performing arts companies and venues, past and present.

A
Academy of Music (also known as Harry Williams' Academy of Music)
Allegheny Theater (also known as Hazlett Theater within the Carnegie Free Library of Allegheny)
Alumni Theatre Company (current)
Alvin Theatre (Pittsburgh) 
Allegheny Repertory Theatre 
American Ibsen Theatre 
Apple Hill Playhouse 
August Wilson Center for African American Culture (current)
Attack Production (current)
Avenue Cinema

B
Bald Theatre Company (current)
Barebones productions (current)
Benedum Center (current)
Black Horizon Theater
Bricolage Production Company (current)
Byham Theater (current)

C
Caravan Theatre of Pittsburgh (current)
Carnegie Music Hall (current)
Carnegie Mellon School of Drama (current)
Carrnivale Theatrics (current)
 Casino Musee
Center Stage Dinner Theatre
Characters East Theatre
City Theatre (Pittsburgh) (current)
Pittsburgh CLO (current)
Comtra Theater
Cultural District, Pittsburgh (current)
Cup-A-Jo Productions (current)

D
Dance Alloy
Davis Theatre 
Duquesne Gardens
Duquesne Theatre 
Duquesne University Tamburitzans (current)

E
East End Theatre 
Enright Theatre 
Exposition Park

F
Fifth Avenue Lyceum
Fine Line Theatre Company 
Fulton Theatre (now known as the Byham Theater)
Future Ten (current)

G
Gayety Theatre (now known as the Byham Theater)
Gemini Theatre Company (current) 
Grand Opera House 
Greensburg Civic Theatre (current) 
Grey Box Theatre (current)

H
 Harris Theater (Pittsburgh) (current)
 Harry Williams' Academy of Music 
Hartwood Theatre on the Green 
Hazlett Theater (also known as Allegheny Theater within the Carnegie Free Library of Allegheny)
Heinz Hall (current)
Hiawatha Project (current)
The Hillman Center for Performing Arts at Shady Side Academy

I
Ironclad Agreement Theatre Company

J
Jewish Theatre of Pittsburgh 
Joe Negri Auditorium (current)

K
Kelly-Strayhorn Theater (current)
 Klopfer's Hall
Kresge Theatre (current)
Kuntu Repertory Theatre

L
Laurel Highlands Regional Theatre 
 Library Hall
Little Lake (current)
Lovelace Theatre

M
Mckeesport Little Theater

N
99¢ Floating Theater 
New Group Theater
New Hazlett Theater (also known as Allegheny Theater within the Carnegie Free Library of Allegheny) (current)
Nixon Theatre
No Name Players (current)

O
O'Reilly Theater (current)
Odd Chair Playhouse 
Off the Wall Productions (current)
Open Stage Theatre (current) 
Opera Theatre of Pittsburgh (Now Pittsburgh Festival Opera) (current)
Organic Theater Pittsburgh (current)

P
Penn Theatre
Phase 3 Productions (current)
Pitt Theatre 
Pittsburgh Ballet (current)
Pittsburgh Black Theatre Dance Ensemble
Pittsburgh Creative and Performing Arts School (current)
Pittsburgh Dance Council (current)
Pittsburgh Irish and Classical Theatre (current) 
Pittsburgh Laboratory Theatre 
Pittsburgh Metropolitan Stage Company 
Pittsburgh Musical Theater (current)
Pittsburgh New Works Festival (current)
Pittsburgh Opera
Pittsburgh Playhouse (current) 
Pittsburgh Playwrights Theatre Company (current)
Pittsburgh Public Theater (current)
Pittsburgh Savoyards (current)
Pittsburgh Theatre 
Prime Stage Theatre

Q
Quantum Theatre (current)

R
Red Barn Theatre 
Red Masquers (current)

S
Schenley Theatre 
St. Vincent's College 
Sheridan Square Theatre 
Sherwood Forest Theatre 
Soho Repertory Theatre 
South Park Conservatory Theatre
Squonk Opera  (current)
Stage 62
Stage & Steel Productions (current)
Stage Right (Pittsburgh) (current)
Stanley Theatre (also known as the Benedum Center)
Stephen Foster Memorial (current)
Summer Company (current)
Syria Mosque

T
Terra Nova Theatre Group (current)
Theatre Express 
Theatre Factory
Theatre Sans Serif (current)
Theatre Urge
Throughline Theatre Company (current)
Tivoli Garden
Trimble's Varieties Theatre

U
Ujima Theatre 
University of Pittsburgh Stages (current) 
Unseam'd Shakespeare Company (current) 
Upstairs Theatre

W
William Penn Playhouse

References

Ford E. and Harriet R. Curtis Theatre Collection of Pittsburgh Theatre Programs (Ford E. and Harriet R. Curtis Theatre Collection of Pittsburgh Theatre Programs, 1840-, Curtis Theatre Collection, Special Collections Department, University of Pittsburgh)

See also
Theatre in Pittsburgh

Culture of Pittsburgh
Performing arts